The 2014–15 Biathlon World Cup – World Cup 8 was held in Holmenkollen, Norway, from 12 February until 15 February 2015.

Schedule of events

Medal winners

Men

Women

References 

8
2015 in Norwegian sport
February 2015 sports events in Europe
International sports competitions in Oslo
2015 Biathlon World Cup – World Cup 8
World Cup – World Cup 9